Robert Rolland (1887–1976) was an Australian tennis player. He completed a law degree at Melbourne university in 1910 and was admitted to practice law in 1911. Rolland entered the Australasian championships only once in 1911. He volleyed brilliantly to beat Rupert Wertheim. Then Rolland beat Ernest Down before losing to Norman Brookes in four sets. In world war 1, Rolland enlisted in the 58th battalion in 1916, but whilst on board ship contracted mumps and was hospitalised on arrival in England. He arrived in France in January 1917 and was made 2nd Lieutenant in the 60th battalion. Later he was appointed to the 15th infantry brigade headquarters. In late 1917 he broke his leg in a tobogganing accident. He was hospitalised and then sent home in 1918. After the war he married and moved to Sale and maintained a legal practice. He was also a town councillor. In 1957 he was awarded the OBE.

References

1887 births
1976 deaths
Australian male tennis players
Tennis players from Melbourne
People from South Yarra, Victoria
University of Melbourne alumni
Lawyers from Melbourne
Military personnel from Melbourne
Australian military personnel of World War I
Australian Officers of the Order of the British Empire